Hamdard Laboratories (India), is a Unani pharmaceutical company in India (following the independence of India from Britain, "Hamdard" Unani branches were established in Bangladesh (erstwhile East Pakistan) and Pakistan). It was established in 1906 by Hakeem Hafiz Abdul Majeed in Delhi, and became a waqf (non-profitable trust) in 1948. Some of its most popular products include Sharbat Rooh Afza, Safi, Roghan Badam Shirin, Sualin, Joshina and Cinkara. It is associated with Hamdard Foundation, a charitable educational trust.

Hamdard Laboratories was founded in 1906 in Delhi by Hakeem Hafiz Abdul Majeed and Ansarullah Tabani, a Unani practitioner. The name Hamdard means "companion in suffering" in Urdu language.(itself borrowed from Persian) 
Hakim Hafiz Abdul Majeed was born in Pilibhit City UP, India in 1883 to Sheikh Rahim Bakhsh. He is said to have learnt the complete Quran Sharif by heart. He also studied the origin of Urdu and Persian languages. Subsequently, he acquired the highest degree in the unani system of medicine.

Hakim Hafiz Abdul Majeed got in touch with Hakim Zamal Khan, who had a keen interest in herbs and was famous for identifying medicinal plants. Having consulted with his wife, Abdul Majeed set up a herbal shop at Hauz Qazi in Delhi in 1906 and started to produce herbal medicine there. In 1920 the small herbal shop turned into a full-fledged production house.

Hamdard Foundation was created in 1964 to disburse the profits of the company to promote the interests of the society. All the profits of the company go to the foundation.

After Abdul Majeed's death, his son Hakeem Abdul Hameed took over the administration of Hamdard Laboratories at the age of fourteen.

Hamdard Laboratories has a twin manufacturing plant in Ghaziabad and one plant in Manesar Haryana. One of its products, Safi has high demand in the country since it is believed to be used for blood purification.

See also
 Hamdard Public School
 Jamia Hamdard
 CRIUM, Hyderabad

References

External links
 Official website

Pharmaceutical companies established in 1906
Pharmaceutical companies of India
Unani medicine organisations
Companies based in New Delhi
Indian brands
Ayurvedic companies
Indian companies established in 1906